Lac des Mille Lacs 22A1 is a First Nations reserve on the shores of Lac des Mille Lacs in Thunder Bay District in northwestern Ontario, Canada. It is one of two reserves for the Lac des Mille Lacs First Nation.

References

Saulteaux reserves in Ontario
Communities in Thunder Bay District